Megan Page or Paige may refer to:

Megan Page, see 2012 Women's World Junior Squash Championships
Megan Page, musician in Frightwig
Megan Paige, character in The Alphabet Killer